Clifton is a small village to the south-west of Doncaster, within the boundary of the civil parish of Conisbrough Parks, which had a population of 385 at the 2001 Census, reducing to 374 at the 2011 Census.

Former Leeds United and Scotland football captain Billy Bremner was resident in Clifton until his death.

References

External links

Villages in South Yorkshire